Sexton is a rural locality in the Gympie Region, Queensland, Australia. In the  Sexton had a population of 161 people.

History 
The Nanango railway line opened in December 1886 as far as Kilkivan.

Carmyle Provisional School opened on 30 July 1906. On 1 January 1909 it became Carmyle State School. In closed in 1910, but reopened in 1911. It closed in December 1963.

Sexton Provisional School opened on 1913. On 1 December 1914 it became Sexton State School. In 1922 it became a half-time provisional school in conjunction with Miva Provisional School (meaning the two schools shared a single teacher). Sexton Provisional School closed in 1924.

In the  Sexton had a population of 161 people.

References 

Gympie Region
Localities in Queensland